was a women's football team which played in Division 1 of Japan's Nadeshiko League. It founded the league back in 1993.

Results

See also 
Japanese women's club teams

References

Women's football clubs in Japan
1976 establishments in Japan
Sports teams in Aichi Prefecture